Psalidostetha banksiae, also known as the banksia moth is a moth of the family Notodontidae. It is found throughout Australia.

The larvae feed on Banksia, Hakea, Dryandra and Grevillea leaves.

References

Notodontidae